Levente Associations or simply levente were paramilitary youth organizations in Hungary during the interwar period and the Second World War. They were established in 1921 with the declared purpose of physical and health training. As of the mid-1930s, they became a de facto method of circumventing the ban on conscription imposed on Hungary by the Treaty of Trianon and over time, openly became a paramilitary organization under the leadership of military veterans. As of 1939, under the Act of Defense, all boys aged 12–21 were required to join the levente.

The levente are usually compared to the Hitler Youth of Nazi Germany and the Opera Nazionale Balilla of Italy, but while they also undertook military training, the levente were neither openly fascist nor particularly politicized, although they were not completely removed from the political influences of the time.

The levente had a smaller female branch, Leventelányok ("Levente Girls"), created as a voluntary organization in June 1942. Under the rule of Ferenc Szálasi, installed by the Nazis in Hungary in October 1944, mandatory levente duties were imposed on girls aged 12–19, despite strong opposition from the Catholic Church. However, the changes were never implemented because of the advance of the Red Army.

By the end of World War II, levente members were forced to serve in auxiliary military forces.

During the postwar Soviet occupation, many levente activists were tried by Soviet tribunals, convicted of "anti-Soviet activities" and deported to the USSR for penal labor.

Gallery

References

See also

Deutsche Jugend, a youth organization of ethnic Germans in Hungary
Great Japan Youth Party
Hitler Jugend
Opera Nazionale Balilla
Brannik
National Youth Organisation
Nationale Jeugdstorm (NJS), a Dutch far right youth group of World War II times 

Military history of Hungary
Military youth groups
Youth organizations established in 1921
Organizations disestablished in 1945
Youth organisations based in Hungary